Doty,  Washington is an unincorporated community located 1.3-miles directly west of Dryad and 5 miles east of Pe Ell on Washington State Route 6. Today, about 250 people reside in or around Doty, which boasts a general store, post office, fire department, and two churches. Logging and farming are the industries that most of the residents rely on for income.

History

Chauncey A. Doty built a sawmill in the area around 1900, and the community that sprang up around it was named after him.  Doty once boasted the largest sawmill in Lewis County.

Parks and recreation

Many residents in Doty participate in the annual Pe Ell River Run that has been held since 1978. The event consists of entrants buying or building water crafts and floating down the Chehalis River from Pe Ell to Rainbow Falls State Park, where riders can float over a slight waterfall that still remains despite severe flooding damage due to the Great Coastal Gale of 2007.

The Willapa Hills Trail passes thru the area.

Climate
This region experiences warm (but not hot) and dry summers, with no average monthly temperatures above 71.6 °F.  According to the Köppen Climate Classification system, Doty has a warm-summer Mediterranean climate, abbreviated "Csb" on climate maps.

References

Populated places in Lewis County, Washington
Unincorporated communities in Lewis County, Washington
Unincorporated communities in Washington (state)